The Chocolate Surpresa was a brand of chocolate made by Nestlé in Brazil. 
It was introduced on 1983 and was popular in the 1980s and the early 1990s, but its popularity declined and it ceased to be produced in the year of 2000.

The chocolate itself was a common black milky bar, flat and thin. But what really made it achieve so much success was that each of them would come with a figure made on a thin cardboard paper with a picture of an animal on it.

The Albums 

Nestlé, understanding the potential of the pictures, started making themed albums where the pictures would be glued. To obtain the albums, kids in Brazil would buy three or four bars of Chocolate Surpresa and send the packaging in a letter to Nestle. A few days later the album would arrive at home.

Each year, a new album would be available with a different theme, such as "Animals from Amazon", "Sea Wonders", etc.. And of course the pictures on the chocolate would change too. The Chocolate Surpresa "album fever" was so big, that many kids would buy the chocolate only for the picture, and many times discard the chocolate itself or keep it for later.

The albums would include a page for each animal, with the space to glue the picture and also many infos on that particular animal, including popular name, scientific name, natural habitat, etc.

Chocolate Surpresa is nowadays a cult icon of Brazilian's 1980s and remembered with nostalgia by people that grew up in that decade.

Nestlé brands